The 2017 Stanley Cup playoffs of the National Hockey League (NHL) began on April 12, 2017, after the 2016–17 regular season and concluded on June 11, 2017, with the Pittsburgh Penguins defeating the Nashville Predators four games to two in the Finals to win the Stanley Cup for the second consecutive year.

The Washington Capitals made the playoffs as the Presidents' Trophy winners for the second consecutive year with the most points (i.e. best record) during the regular season. The Detroit Red Wings failed to make the playoffs for the first time since the 1989–90 season, ending the NHL's longest active playoff streak at 25 consecutive seasons; the streak was also tied for the third-longest streak in NHL history. The longest active playoff streak moved to the Pittsburgh Penguins with eleven consecutive appearances. The Edmonton Oilers made the playoffs for the first time since 2006, ending a then-record-tying playoff drought for a team with ten years missed (the Florida Panthers also missed the playoffs between 2001 and 2011 inclusively. Buffalo set the record in 2022 missing eleven consecutive postseasons.). For the first time since 2006, both Alberta teams, the Oilers and the Calgary Flames, qualified for the postseason in the same year. For the first time since 2013, and the fourth time since 2002, all three Eastern Canadian teams (Montreal Canadiens, Ottawa Senators, and Toronto Maple Leafs) qualified for the playoffs. In all, five Canadian-based teams made the playoffs, matching 2004 and 2015, after a season in which none of the seven teams in Canada contended. Five Original Six teams made the playoffs, with only the previously mentioned Red Wings failing to make it.

The first round saw eighteen overtime games, eclipsing the previous record of seventeen overtime games in the first round set in 2013. There were 27 total overtime games in these playoffs, one short of the record set in 1993. It was also the first time since 2001 that no first round series went the full seven games.

For the eighth season in a row (and the twelfth time in the last fourteen seasons), a California-based team was in the Western Conference Final.

Playoff seeds

This was the fourth year in which the top three teams in each division make the playoffs, along with two wild cards in each conference (for a total of eight playoff teams from each conference).

The following teams qualified for the playoffs:

Eastern Conference

Atlantic Division
 Montreal Canadiens, Atlantic Division champions – 103 points
 Ottawa Senators – 98 points
 Boston Bruins – 95 points (42 )

Metropolitan Division
 Washington Capitals, Metropolitan Division champions, Eastern Conference regular season champions, Presidents' Trophy winners – 118 points
 Pittsburgh Penguins – 111 points
 Columbus Blue Jackets – 108 points

Wild cards
 New York Rangers – 102 points
 Toronto Maple Leafs – 95 points (39 )

Western Conference

Central Division
 Chicago Blackhawks, Central Division champions, Western Conference regular season champions – 109 points
 Minnesota Wild – 106 points
 St. Louis Blues – 99 points

Pacific Division
 Anaheim Ducks, Pacific Division champions – 105 points
 Edmonton Oilers – 103 points
 San Jose Sharks – 99 points

Wild cards
 Calgary Flames – 94 points (41 )
 Nashville Predators – 94 points (39 )

Playoff bracket
In each round, teams competed in a best-of-seven series following a 2–2–1–1–1 format (scores in the bracket indicate the number of games won in each best-of-seven series). The team with home ice advantage played at home for games one and two (and games five and seven, if necessary), and the other team was at home for games three and four (and game six, if necessary). The top three teams in each division made the playoffs, along with two wild cards in each conference, for a total of eight teams from each conference.

In the First Round, the lower seeded wild card in the conference played against the division winner with the best record while the other wild card played against the other division winner, and both wild cards were de facto #4 seeds. The other series matched the second and third place teams from the divisions. In the first two rounds, home ice advantage was awarded to the team with the better seed; in the last two rounds, it was awarded to the team that had the better regular season record.

Legend
 A1, A2, A3 – The first, second, and third place teams from the Atlantic Division, respectively
 M1, M2, M3 – The first, second, and third place teams from the Metropolitan Division, respectively
 C1, C2, C3 – The first, second, and third place teams from the Central Division, respectively
 P1, P2, P3 – The first, second, and third place teams from the Pacific Division, respectively
 WC – Wild Card teams

First Round

Eastern Conference First Round

(A1) Montreal Canadiens vs. (WC1) New York Rangers

The Montreal Canadiens finished first in the Atlantic Division earning 103 points. The New York Rangers finished as the Eastern Conference's first wild-card, earning 102 points. This was the sixteenth playoff meeting between these two teams with New York winning eight of the fifteen previous series. They last met in the 2014 Eastern Conference Final, in which New York won in six games. Montreal won all three games in this year's regular-season series.

The Rangers eliminated the Canadiens in six games. In the first game of the series, Tanner Glass and Michael Grabner scored the only goals of the games as the Rangers won the game 2–0 on Henrik Lundqvist's 31-save shutout. In game two, the Canadiens tied the game with 18 seconds left, then in overtime, Alexander Radulov pushed it past the Rangers' goaltender to give Montreal a 4–3 victory. Radulov continued his scoring into game three, getting a goal and an assist to help the Canadiens achieve a 3–1 victory. The Rangers ended a six-game home-losing streak after game four, winning 2–1 over the Canadiens to tie the series 2–2. Mika Zibanejad got the overtime-winner for the Rangers in game five after Chris Kreider deflected a pass off of Canadiens defenceman Alexei Emelin, landing towards the forward who put it past goaltender Carey Price in a 3–2 win. Mats Zuccarello scored twice in game six as the Rangers eliminated the Canadiens in a 3–1 victory to advance to the second round.

{{NHLPlayoffs
|team1=New York Rangers
|team2=Montreal Canadiens
|stadium2=Madison Square Garden
|stadium1=Bell Centre

|date1       =April 12
|score1      =2–0
|won1        =1
|recap1      =www.nhl.com/news/new-york-rangers-montreal-canadiens-game-recap/c-288723114
|1-1-1       =Tanner Glass (1) – 09:50
|1-1-2       =No scoring
|1-2-1       =No scoring
|1-2-2       =No scoring
|1-3-1       =Michael Grabner (1) – en'’ – 18:50
|1-3-2       =No scoring|goalie1-1   =Henrik Lundqvist 31 saves / 31 shots
|goalie1-2   =Carey Price 29 saves / 30 shots

|date2       =April 14
|score2      =3–4
|ot2         =1
|won2        =2
|recap2      =www.nhl.com/news/new-york-rangers-montreal-canadiens-game-recap/c-288801196
|2-1-1       =Michael Grabner (2) – 13:48
|2-1-2       =04:05 – Jeff Petry (1)15:42 – Paul Byron (1)
|2-2-1       =Rick Nash (1) – 09:58Mats Zuccarello (1) – 14:47
|2-2-2       =No scoring|2-3-1       =No scoring|2-3-2       =19:42 – Tomas Plekanec (1)
|2-4-1       =No scoring|2-4-2       =18:34 – Alexander Radulov (1)
|goalie2-1   =Henrik Lundqvist 54 saves / 58 shots
|goalie2-2   =Carey Price 35 saves / 38 shots

|date3       =April 16
|score3      =3–1
|won3        =2
|recap3      =www.nhl.com/news/montreal-canadiens-new-york-rangers-game-3-recap/c-288850154
|3-1-1       =No scoring|3-1-2       =No scoring|3-2-1       =No scoring|3-2-2       =Artturi Lehkonen (1) – pp – 17:37
|3-3-1       =17:04 – Brady Skjei (1)
|3-3-2       =Shea Weber (1) – pp – 07:42Alexander Radulov (2) – 15:35
|goalie3-1   =Henrik Lundqvist 26 saves / 29 shots
|goalie3-2   =Carey Price 20 saves / 21 shots

|date4       =April 18
|score4      =1–2
|won4        =1
|recap4      =www.nhl.com/news/montreal-canadiens-new-york-rangers-game-recap/c-288917218
|4-1-1       =11:39 – Jesper Fast (1)
|4-1-2       =Torrey Mitchell (1) – 18:37
|4-2-1       =04:28 – Rick Nash (2)
|4-2-2       =No scoring|4-3-1       =No scoring|4-3-2       =No scoring|goalie4-1   =Henrik Lundqvist 23 saves / 24 shots
|goalie4-2   =Carey Price 30 saves / 32 shots

|date5       =April 20
|score5      =3–2
|ot5         =1
|won5        =1
|recap5      =www.nhl.com/news/new-york-rangers-montreal-canadiens-game-5-recap/c-288979184
|5-1-1       =Jesper Fast (2) – sh – 15:56
|5-1-2       =12:07 – Artturi Lehkonen (2)16:20 – pp – Brendan Gallagher (1)
|5-2-1       =Brady Skjei (2) – 18:28
|5-2-2       =No scoring|5-3-1       =No scoring|5-3-2       =No scoring|5-4-1       =Mika Zibanejad (1) – 14:22
|5-4-2       =No scoring|goalie5-1   =Henrik Lundqvist 34 saves / 36 shots
|goalie5-2   =Carey Price 33 saves / 36 shots

|date6       =April 22
|score6      =1–3
|won6        =1
|recap6      =www.nhl.com/news/montreal-canadiens-new-york-rangers-game-6-recap/c-289033544
|6-1-1       =No scoring|6-1-2       =Alexei Emelin (1) – 06:19
|6-2-1       =02:26 – pp – Mats Zuccarello (2)13:31 – Mats Zuccarello (3)
|6-2-2       =No scoring|6-3-1       =19:42 – Derek Stepan - en’’- (1)
|6-3-2       =No scoring|goalie6-1   =Henrik Lundqvist 27 saves / 28 shots
|goalie6-2   =Carey Price 20 saves / 22 shots

|series = New York won series 4–2
}}

(A2) Ottawa Senators vs. (A3) Boston Bruins

The Ottawa Senators finished second in the Atlantic Division, earning 98 points. The Boston Bruins earned 95 points in the regular season to finish third in the Atlantic. This was the first playoff meeting between the contemporary Ottawa franchise and Boston, and the first Boston-Ottawa series since the 1927 Stanley Cup Finals. Ottawa won all four games in this year's regular season series.

The Senators eliminated the Bruins in six games. In the first game, the Senators gained a 1–0 lead into the third on Bobby Ryan's goal in the second period, however, the Bruins scored twice in the final period with Brad Marchand having the final tally 2:33 before the game ended 2–1 for Boston. In game two, Ottawa came back from a two-goal deficit in the third period and won via Dion Phaneuf whose goal in overtime helped tie the series 1–1 after a 4–3 conquest. In game three, Ottawa had a three-goal lead with Mike Hoffman scoring twice, but the Bruins came back with three goals in the third period. In overtime, Bruins forward Riley Nash took a roughing penalty and on the ensuing power play, Bobby Ryan tipped in a pass from Kyle Turris ending the game 4–3 for the Senators. Bobby Ryan scored the only goal in game four, at the 5:49 mark of the third period, allowing the Senators to achieve a 3–1 series lead. Boston came back from an early 2–0 deficit in game five and the game would go to overtime. In double-overtime, Bruins rookie Sean Kuraly scored his second goal of the game, completing the comeback in a 3–2 feat. In game six, Clarke MacArthur scored the series-winning goal on the power play in overtime for Ottawa to advance to the second round.

(M1) Washington Capitals vs. (WC2) Toronto Maple Leafs

The Washington Capitals earned the Presidents' Trophy for the second consecutive year as the NHL's best regular season team this time with 118 points. The Toronto Maple Leafs finished as the Eastern Conference's second wild-card, earning 95 points. This was the first playoff meeting between these two teams. Washington won two of the three games in this year's regular season series.

This became only the third playoff series in NHL history in which five games were decided in overtime (the first being the 1951 Stanley Cup Finals between the Toronto Maple Leafs and the Montreal Canadiens and the second occurring in the 2012 Western Conference Quarterfinals between the Phoenix Coyotes and the Chicago Blackhawks).

The Capitals defeated the Maple Leafs in six games. Although Toronto had a two-goal lead in the first ten minutes of the first game, Washington scored two goals, both from Justin Williams, and won the game 3–2 in overtime from Tom Wilson's goal. In game two, rookie Kasperi Kapanen scored twice including the game-winner in double-overtime leading the Maple Leafs to a 4–3 victory. Washington took two two-goal leads in game three; the first pick in the 2016 NHL Draft, Auston Matthews, helped soften the lead with his first playoff goal, but after the Capitals got a 3–1 lead, the Maple Leafs scored twice to tie the game. Then in overtime, Tyler Bozak tipped a shot past the Capitals' goaltender to give the Leafs a 2–1 series lead. Game four was the only game of the series not to go into overtime; Tom Wilson and T. J. Oshie both scored two goals and Oshie's second goal proved to be the game-winner in a 5–4 victory after an attempted comeback by Toronto was thwarted. Game five featured the fourth overtime game of this series with Justin Williams scoring for Capitals in a 2–1, taking a 3–2 series lead in the process. In game six, the game went to overtime for the fifth time this series and at 6:31 of the first overtime period Marcus Johansson scored his second goal for the Capitals in a 2–1 victory and another trip to the second round.

(M2) Pittsburgh Penguins vs. (M3) Columbus Blue Jackets

The Pittsburgh Penguins finished second in the Metropolitan Division earning 111 points. The Columbus Blue Jackets earned 108 points to finish third in the Metropolitan. This was the second playoff meeting between these teams; they last met in the 2014 Eastern Conference First Round, which Pittsburgh won in six games. The teams split this year's four-game regular season series.

The Penguins defeated the Blue Jackets in five games. Before game one began, Matt Murray, the starting goaltender for the Penguins, injured himself during warm-ups forcing Marc-Andre Fleury, who had been demoted to the backup for the season, to start the game; his team would win the game 3–1, making 31 saves in the process. Sidney Crosby got a goal and two assists in game two as the Penguins defeated the Blue Jackets 4–1 and took a 2–0 series lead. In game three, Jake Guentzel scored a hat-trick, his third being the overtime-winner as the Penguins came back from a two-goal deficit and defeated the Blue Jackets 5–4 and take a 3–0 series lead. Columbus avoided a sweep in game four, scoring with five different players in a 5–4 victory; this was also the franchise's first playoff win in regulation. In game five, Bryan Rust scored twice, including the series-winner, and Fleury made 49 saves in a 5–2 win for the Penguins to advance to the second round.

Western Conference First Round

(C1) Chicago Blackhawks vs. (WC2) Nashville Predators

The Chicago Blackhawks finished first in the Central Division earning 109 points. The Nashville Predators finished as the Western Conference's second wild-card, earning 94 points. This was the third playoff meeting between these teams with Chicago winning both previous series. They last met in the 2015 Western Conference First Round, which Chicago won in six games. Chicago won four of the five games in this year's regular season series.

The Predators defeated the Blackhawks in a four-game sweep; this was the first time in NHL playoff history that an eighth-seeded team swept a playoff series against the top seed in their conference. Viktor Arvidsson scored the only goal in game one as the Predators shut out the Blackhawks, stopping all 29 shots they faced. The Blackhawks remained scoreless after game two, instead being outscored 5–0 with Pekka Rinne not only stopping all 30 shots he faced, but also providing two assists. Chicago finally scored a goal in game three and they maintained a two-goal lead throughout the second period, but in the third period, Filip Forsberg scored twice for Nashville to tie the game and send it to overtime. In overtime, Nashville forward Kevin Fiala skated around Chicago goalie Corey Crawford and put the puck past the Chicago netminder to complete the comeback in a 3–2 victory giving them their first 3–0 series lead. In game four, Roman Josi scored twice in a 4–1 victory and Rinne made 30 saves for the Predators, who swept a playoff opponent for the first time in franchise history.

(C2) Minnesota Wild vs. (C3) St. Louis Blues

The Minnesota Wild finished second in the Central Division earning 106 points. The St. Louis Blues earned 99 points to finish third in the Central. This was the second playoff meeting between these teams; their only previous meeting was the 2015 Western Conference First Round, which Minnesota won in six games. St. Louis won three of the five games in this year's regular season series.

The Blues defeated the Wild in five games. St. Louis won the first game of the series 2–1 17:48 into overtime from Joel Edmundson's wrist shot after the Wild tied the game in the final minute of the game, Jake Allen made 51 saves in the process. In game two, Jaden Schwartz scored the game-winner with 2:27 left in the third period, giving the Blues another 2–1 victory over the Wild. The Wild continued to score only one goal in each game this series, losing the game nevertheless, this time 3–1 as Allen made 40 saves and the Blues took a 3–0 series lead. Devan Dubnyk kept the Wild alive in the series, stopping all 28 shots he faced in a 2–0 victory in game four. In game five, the Blues took a 3–1 lead in the third period only to see the Wild tie it up in the last ten minutes. However, in overtime, Magnus Paajarvi ended the game for St. Louis, defeating the Wild 4–3 to advance to the second round.

(P1) Anaheim Ducks vs. (WC1) Calgary Flames

The Anaheim Ducks finished first in the Pacific Division for the fifth consecutive year, this time earning 105 points. The Calgary Flames finished as the Western Conference's first wild-card, earning 94 points. This was the third playoff meeting between these teams with Anaheim winning both previous series. They last met in the 2015 Western Conference Second Round which Anaheim won in five games. Anaheim won four of the five games in this year's regular season series. Anaheim has also won 25 straight regular-season home games against Calgary.

The Ducks defeated the Flames in a four-game sweep. In game one, both Ryan Getzlaf and Jakob Silfverberg had a goal and an assist, the latter of whom had the game-winning goal in a 3–2 victory for the Ducks. Anaheim continued their home-dominance over Calgary defeating the Flames 3–2 with a goal and an assist by Getzlaf again. The Flames had a lead of 4–1 in game three, forcing Ducks goaltender John Gibson to be replaced by Jonathan Bernier. The Ducks came back in this game, scoring three times, in what would become the fourth overtime game of this night. Corey Perry then threw the puck towards the net and it bounced off both Calgary goaltender Brian Elliott and defenceman Michael Stone and into the net, to give the Ducks a 3–0 series lead. In game four, Gibson stopped 36 shots by the Flames, but allowed only one goal as the Ducks ended the series with a 3–1 win.

(P2) Edmonton Oilers vs. (P3) San Jose Sharks

The Edmonton Oilers finished second in the Pacific Division with 103 points. The San Jose Sharks earned 99 points in the regular season to finish third in the Pacific. Edmonton started a playoff series at home for the first time since the 1991 Campbell Conference Final. This was the second playoff meeting between these teams; their only previous series was the 2006 Western Conference Semifinals, which Edmonton won in six games. Edmonton won three of the five games in this year's regular season series.

The Oilers defeated the Sharks in six games. In Edmonton's first playoff game since 2006, the Oilers took a 2–0 lead in the first period, but the Sharks scored three goals over the second, third, and first overtime period winning the game 3–2 from Melker Karlsson's goal. The Oilers scored two shorthanded goals in game two as they blanked San Jose 2–0. The shutout streak continued in game three, as Zack Kassian scored the only goal for the Oilers and Cam Talbot stopped 23 shots. Logan Couture and Joe Pavelski scored two goals each and Martin Jones stopped all 23 shots as the Sharks blanked the Oilers 7–0 in game four to tie the series at two. The Sharks gained a 3–1 lead over the Oilers in game five, but both Mark Letestu and Oscar Klefbom scored to tie the game and send it to overtime. David Desharnais would end it at 18:15 of overtime to give the Oilers a 4–3 triumph and a 3–2 series lead. In game six, the Oilers scored twice in the second period, both on breakaways, and closed out the series with a 3–1 win.

Second Round

Eastern Conference Second Round

(A2) Ottawa Senators vs. (WC1) New York Rangers

This was the second playoff meeting between these two teams; their only previous series was in the 2012 Eastern Conference Quarterfinals, which New York won in seven games. This was the second time under the current playoff format and the second year in a row in which a wild-card team had more points than its opponent during the regular season but did not have home ice advantage; the other time was the Tampa Bay Lightning and the New York Islanders in last year's Eastern Conference Second Round. Ottawa won two of the three games in this year's regular season series.

The Senators defeated the Rangers in six games. In the first game, goaltender Craig Anderson made 34 saves in a 2–1 victory for the Senators. The Rangers had leads of 3–1, 4–2, and 5–3 in game two only to have the Senators tie up the game on Jean-Gabriel Pageau's hat-trick goal with 1:02 remaining. In double-overtime, Pageau's fourth goal of the game gave the Senators a 6–5 win and a 2–0 series lead. In doing this, he became the first player to score four goals in a playoff game since Johan Franzen scored four goals for the Detroit Red Wings in game four of their 2010 second round series against the San Jose Sharks. Mats Zuccarello had a goal and an assist in game three as the Rangers won the affair 4–1. The Rangers defeated the Senators 4–1 again in game four, tying the series 2–2; Oscar Lindberg scored twice in the victory. The Rangers got an early two-goal lead in game five, but the Senators came back scoring three goals in return. The Rangers regained the lead, but former Ranger Derick Brassard tied the game in the final minutes to send it to overtime. Kyle Turris ended the game 6:28 into overtime to give the Senators a 5–4 victory and a 3–2 series lead. In game six, Erik Karlsson netted the series-winning goal and added an assist for the Senators who advanced to the Conference Finals for the first time in ten years after a 4–2 victory.

(M1) Washington Capitals vs. (M2) Pittsburgh Penguins

This was the tenth playoff meeting between these teams and the second consecutive in the second round. Pittsburgh has won eight of the nine previous series including last year's confrontation which ended in six games. These teams split their four-game regular season series.

The Penguins defeated the Capitals in seven games after they gave up a 3–1 series lead. In the final eight minutes of game one, Nick Bonino scored the game-winning goal as the Penguins once led 2–0 only to have Washington score twice to tie the game, then with 8:24 left in the third period Bonino gave the Penguins a 3–2 lead and thus the victory. Phil Kessel and Jake Guentzel both scored twice for the Penguins in a 6–2 victory, gaining a 2–0 series lead as a result. The Capitals got an early 1–0 lead in game three, then a goal by Evgeny Kuznetsov put them up by two goals, however, in the final two minutes of the game, the Penguins tied the score 2–2. In overtime, Trevor Daley of the Penguins was penalized for holding and on the ensuing power play, Kevin Shattenkirk scored to give the Capitals a 3–2 victory. Pittsburgh lead 2–0 in game four only to have Washington tie the game, however, 2:49 after Nate Schmidt tied the game for Washington, Justin Schultz on the power play gave the Penguins a 3–2 lead and the victory. Washington scored three times in the third period of game five after being down one goal to win 4–2. Andre Burakovsky scored twice in game six, forcing a seventh game in Washington's 5–2 triumph. In game seven, Marc-Andre Fleury stopped all 29 shots and Bryan Rust scored the series-winning goal to defeat the Capitals 2–0 and advance to the Conference Finals for the second consecutive year.

Western Conference Second Round

(C3) St. Louis Blues vs. (WC2) Nashville Predators

This was the first playoff meeting between these teams. Nashville won three of the five games in this year's regular season series.

The Predators defeated the Blues in six games. The first game of the series had Nashville gain a 3–1 lead, St. Louis then scored twice in the third period to tie the game, but with 5:05 left in the third period, Vernon Fiddler gave the Predators 4–3 lead as well a 1–0 series lead. During the game, Kevin Fiala fractured his left leg after being checked by Robert Bortuzzo; Fiala would require a stretcher to get off the ice. In game two, Vladimir Tarasenko scored twice including the game-winner, tying the series 1–1 in a 3–2 triumph. The Predators continued their home-winning streak dating back to last year's first round winning game three, by a final score of 3–1 with Colton Sissons assisting twice, increasing the streak to seven home games. Nashville won their eighth consecutive playoff home game after game four, defeating the Blues 2–1 and Pekka Rinne making 32 saves. Jaden Schwartz broke a 1–1 tie in the third period of the fifth game and maintained the 2–1 lead to a victory. In game six, Ryan Johansen scored the series-winning goal in a 3–1 victory as the Predators moved onto the Conference Finals for the first time in franchise history after nineteen years in the league. This left the Columbus Blue Jackets as the only team that has never made it to the Conference Finals, after the Winnipeg Jets beat the Predators in the 2018 Western Conference Second Round to make it to the Conference Finals.

(P1) Anaheim Ducks vs. (P2) Edmonton Oilers

This was the second playoff meeting between these teams; their only previous series was in the 2006 Western Conference Final, which Edmonton won in five games. Edmonton won three of the five games in this year's regular season series.

The Ducks defeated the Oilers in seven games. In the first game, Mark Letestu scored twice and Leon Draisaitl had a goal and three assists as the Oilers, who once gained a 3–1 lead in the third period only to see the Ducks tie the game in less than three minutes, scored twice in the final five minutes to achieve a 5–3 lead and thus the victory. Goalie Cam Talbot stopped 39 shots and former-Duck Patrick Maroon scored the game-winning goal in game two for the Oilers' 2–1 victory. Anaheim took an early 3–0 lead in game three only to see the Oilers tie the game. The Ducks took the lead back in the second period with Chris Wagner's goal, then Jakob Silfverberg scored his second of the game and Ryan Kesler provided an insurance goal to close out the game 6–3. In game four, Ryan Getzlaf scored twice to take the lead for the Ducks after being down 2–0 in the game, then in 45 seconds into overtime, Silfverberg scored to give the Ducks the victory and the series tie. The Oilers gained a 3–0 lead in game five, but with 3:16 left in the game, the Ducks scored three times to tie the game becoming the first team to score three goals in that span of time left to tie the game. The comeback was complete at 6:57 of double-overtime when Corey Perry gave Ducks a 4–3 victory and a 3–2 series lead. The Oilers scored five times in the first period of game six and Draisaitl had a hat trick along with two assists to defeat the Ducks 7–1 and force a seventh game. In game seven, Nick Ritchie's goal proved to be the series-winner as the Ducks were able to win a series via seventh game for the first time since 2006 and advance to the Conference Finals with a 2–1 victory.

Conference Finals

Eastern Conference Final

(M2) Pittsburgh Penguins vs. (A2) Ottawa Senators

This was the fifth playoff meeting between these teams with Pittsburgh winning three of the four previous series. They last met in the 2013 Eastern Conference Semifinals, which Pittsburgh won in five games. This was the second consecutive Conference Finals appearance for Pittsburgh who defeated the Tampa Bay Lightning last year in seven games. Ottawa last went to the Conference Finals in 2007; they defeated the Buffalo Sabres in five games. Ottawa won two of the three games in this year's regular season series.

The Penguins defeated the Senators in seven games. In game one, the Senators held onto a one-goal lead until Evgeni Malkin tied the game in the third period, but in overtime, Bobby Ryan scored to give Ottawa a 2–1 victory. The second game remained scoreless until Phil Kessel scored with 6:55 left in the game to give the Penguins a 1–0 lead and the victory; Marc-Andre Fleury made 23 saves in the process. In the first period of game three, the Senators scored four times including three in a span of 2:18 leading them into a 5–1 victory. In his first playoff game since his injury before the first game of the playoffs, goaltender Matt Murray made 24 saves and stopped a comeback from Ottawa in a 3–2 victory for Pittsburgh. Murray stopped all 26 shots and the Penguins routed the Senators 7–0 in game five to take a 3–2 series lead. Craig Anderson made 45 saves in game six, forcing a seventh game in a 2–1 victory. In game seven, Chris Kunitz of the Penguins and Mark Stone of the Senators started the scoring 20 seconds apart in the second period. After both Justin Schultz and Ryan Dzingel made the game 2–2, the match headed into overtime. In double-overtime, Kunitz scored his second of the game to send the Pittsburgh Penguins to the Finals for the second consecutive year.

Western Conference Final

(P1) Anaheim Ducks vs. (WC2) Nashville Predators

This was the second consecutive playoff meeting and the third overall between these teams with Nashville winning both previous series, including a seven-game win in last year's first round. This was Anaheim's fifth Conference Finals appearance. They last made the Conference Finals in 2015 where they were defeated in seven games by the Chicago Blackhawks. This was Nashville's first Conference Finals appearance in their 19-year history. Anaheim won two of the three games in this year's regular season series.

The Predators defeated the Ducks in six games. The first game of the series went into overtime, and at 9:24 James Neal put the puck past the Ducks goaltender to take game one, 3–2. In game two, the Ducks rallied from an early-two-goal deficit to defeat the Predators 5–3 and Ryan Getzlaf assisted thrice in the victory. Nashville kept their home playoff win streak alive in game three, winning 2–1; after a pair of goals were disallowed due to goaltender interference, Roman Josi scored for the Predators with 2:43 left in the game. Although Nashville tied the game after being down by two goals in game four, Anaheim won the game on Corey Perry's goal 10:25 into overtime, tying the series 2–2 in a 3–2 victory. Pekka Rinne made 32 saves in game five for the Predators as Nashville took a 3–2 series lead in a 3–1 victory. In game six, Colton Sissons' hat trick goal was the series-winning goal in a 6–3 victory, putting the Nashville Predators in the Finals for the first time in their 19-year history.

Stanley Cup Finals

This was the first playoff meeting between these two teams. Pittsburgh made their second consecutive Stanley Cup Finals appearance and their sixth overall; they won in the previous year defeating the San Jose Sharks in six games. Nashville made their first Finals appearance in their franchise's history. These teams split their two-game regular season series.

Player statistics

Skaters
These are the top ten skaters based on points.

Goaltenders
This is a combined table of the top five goaltenders based on goals against average and the top five goaltenders based on save percentage, with at least 420 minutes played. The table is sorted by GAA, and the criteria for inclusion are bolded.

Television
This marked the sixth postseason under NBC Sports' current 10-year contract for American television rights to the NHL. All national coverage of games aired on either NBCSN, the NBC broadcast network, NHL Network, USA Network, or CNBC. During the first round, excluding games exclusively broadcast on NBC, the regional rightsholders of each participating U.S. team produced local telecasts of their respective games; NBCUniversal held exclusive rights to all games from the second round onward. Unlike past seasons, the national broadcasts were no longer blacked out on television in the markets of participating teams, and could co-exist with the local broadcasts (however, NBC-provided streaming was still restricted in Boston and Pittsburgh).

For first-round games involving Chicago, San Jose and Washington—teams whose regional rights are held by the co-owned NBC Sports Regional Networks—the national broadcasts shared the same video as the local broadcasts but overdubbed with national commentators. This was done so NBC would not have to bring additional equipment to these games to produce an entirely separate telecast for the national audience.

In Canada, for the third postseason under Rogers Media's current 12-year contract, coverage was broadcast by Sportsnet and CBC under the Hockey Night in Canada brand, and streamed on Sportsnet Now, CBCSports.ca (for games televised by CBC), or the subscription service Rogers NHL GameCentre Live. French-language coverage was on TVA Sports. Rogers agreed not to schedule games on CBC for the first four Sunday nights of the playoffs, so that the network could broadcast Canada: The Story of Us'', a documentary series it had commissioned as part of programming commemorating the 150th anniversary of Canadian confederation.

References

External links
 2017 Stanley Cup playoffs

Stanley Cup playoffs
play